The 1970 All-SEC football team consists of American football players selected to the All-Southeastern Conference (SEC) chosen by various selectors for the 1970 NCAA University Division football season. LSU won the conference.

Offensive selections

Receivers 
 Terry Beasley, Auburn (AP-1, UPI)
 David Smith, Miss. St. (AP-1, UPI)
 David Bailey, Alabama (AP-2)
 Floyd Franks, Ole Miss (AP-2)

Tight ends 

 Jim Poole, Ole Miss (AP-2, UPI)
 Jim Yancey, Florida (AP-1)

Tackles 

 Worthy McClure, Ole Miss (AP-1, UPI)
 Royce Smith, Georgia (AP-1)
 Tom Nash, Georgia (UPI)
 John Hannah, Alabama (AP-2)
 Danny Speigner, Auburn (AP-2)

Guards 
 Chip Kell, Tennessee (College Football Hall of Fame)  (AP-1, UPI)
 Skip Jernigan, Ole Miss (AP-1, UPI)
Mike Demarie, LSU (AP-2)
Jimmy Speigner, Auburn (AP-2)

Centers 
 Tommy Lyons, Georgia (AP-2, UPI)
 Mike Bevans, Tennessee (AP-1)

Quarterbacks 

 Pat Sullivan, Auburn (College Football Hall of Fame)  (AP-1, UPI)
 Archie Manning, Ole Miss (College Football Hall of Fame)  (AP-2, UPI)

Running backs 
 Johnny Musso, Alabama (AP-1, UPI)
Curt Watson, Tennessee (AP-1, UPI)
 Art Cantrelle, LSU (AP-2)
Randy Reed, Ole Miss (AP-2)

Defensive selections

Ends 

 Jack Youngblood, Florida (College Football Hall of Fame)  (AP-1, UPI)
 Dennis Coleman, Ole Miss (AP-1, UPI)
 Dave Hardt, Kentucky (AP-2)
 Chuck Heard, Georgia (AP-2)

Tackles 

 John Sage, LSU (AP-1, UPI)
Dave Roller, Kentucky (AP-1, UPI)
Ronnie Estay, LSU (AP-2)
Larry Brasher, Georgia (AP-2)

Linebackers 

 Mike Anderson, LSU  (AP-1, UPI)
 Jackie Walker, Tennessee  (AP-1, UPI)
 Bobby Strickland, Auburn (AP-1, UPI)
Chip Wisdom, Georgia (AP-2)
Fred Brister, Ole Miss (AP-2)
Chuck Dees, Miss. St.(AP-2)

Backs 
 Tommy Casanova, LSU (College Football Hall of Fame)  (AP-1, UPI)
Bobby Majors, Tennessee (AP-1, UPI)
 Larry Willingham, Auburn (AP-1, UPI)
 Tim Priest, Tennessee (AP-2, UPI)
Buzy Rosenberg, Georgia (AP-1)
Craig Burns, LSU (AP-2)
Ray Heidel, Ole Miss (AP-2)
Ken Phares, Miss. St. (AP-2)

Special teams

Kicker 

 Gardner Jett, Auburn (AP-1)
Kim Braswell, Georgia (AP-2)

Punter 

 Steve Smith, Vanderbilt (AP-1)
Frank Mann, Alabama (AP-2)

Key

AP = Associated Press

UPI = United Press International

Bold = Consensus first-team selection by both AP and UPI

See also
1970 College Football All-America Team

References

All-SEC
All-SEC football teams